Jin Chang-soo (born 26 October 1985) is a South Korean footballer who plays as midfielder for Ansan Greeners in K League 2.

Career
Jin participated in Korean National Sports Festival in 2008 on one of the members representing ethnic Koreans living in Japan and signed with Pocheon FC after the competition. In 2010, Korea National League side Gangneung FC signed him.

He moved to Goyang Hi FC in 2013.

In January 2015, Jin returned to Goyang after playing one season for Gyeongju KHNP.

References

External links 

1985 births
Living people
Association football midfielders
South Korean footballers
Gangneung City FC players
Goyang Zaicro FC players
Bucheon FC 1995 players
Ansan Greeners FC players
K3 League players
Korea National League players
K League 2 players
Place of birth missing (living people)
Zainichi Korean people